Atoconeura biordinata is a species of dragonfly in the family Libellulidae. It is native to southeastern Africa, where it occurs in the Democratic Republic of the Congo, Kenya, Malawi, Mozambique, Tanzania, Zambia, and Zimbabwe. It is a common species of the highlands, where it lives near forest streams.

References

Libellulidae
Insects described in 1899
Taxonomy articles created by Polbot